In mathematics, the support of a real-valued function  is the subset of the function domain containing the elements which are not mapped to zero. This concept is used very widely in mathematical analysis.

Formulation

Suppose that  is a real-valued function whose domain is an arbitrary set  The  of  written  is the set of points in  where  is non-zero:

If  for all but a finite number of points  then  is said to have .

Closed support

Since the intersection of closed sets is closed,  is the intersection of all closed sets that contain the set-theoretic support of 

For example, if  is the function defined by

The notion of closed support is usually applied to continuous functions, but the definition makes sense for arbitrary real or complex-valued functions on a topological space, and some authors do not require that  (or ) be continuous.

Compact support

For example, the function  defined above is a continuous function with compact support  If  is a smooth function then because  is identically  on the open subset  all of 's partial derivatives of all orders are also identically  on  

The condition of compact support is stronger than the condition of vanishing at infinity. For example, the function  defined by

vanishes at infinity, since  as  but its support  is not compact.

Real-valued compactly supported smooth functions on a Euclidean space are called bump functions. Mollifiers are an important special case of bump functions as they can be used in distribution theory to create sequences of smooth functions approximating nonsmooth (generalized) functions, via convolution.

In good cases, functions with compact support are dense in the space of functions that vanish at infinity, but this property requires some technical work to justify in a given example. As an intuition for more complex examples, and in the language of limits, for any  any function  on the real line  that vanishes at infinity can be approximated by choosing an appropriate compact subset  of  such that

for all  where  is the indicator function of  Every continuous function on a compact topological space has compact support since every closed subset of a compact space is indeed compact.

Essential support

Generalization

If  is an arbitrary set containing zero, the concept of support is immediately generalizable to functions   Support may also be defined for any algebraic structure with identity (such as a group, monoid, or composition algebra), in which the identity element assumes the role of zero. For instance, the family  of functions from the natural numbers to the integers is the uncountable set of integer sequences.  The subfamily  is the countable set of all integer sequences that have only finitely many nonzero entries.

Functions of finite support are used in defining algebraic structures such as group rings and free abelian groups.

In probability and measure theory

In probability theory, the support of a probability distribution can be loosely thought of as the closure of the set of possible values of a random variable having that distribution. There are, however, some subtleties to consider when dealing with general distributions defined on a sigma algebra, rather than on a topological space.

Note that the word  can refer to the logarithm of the likelihood of a probability density function.

Support of a distribution

It is possible also to talk about the support of a distribution, such as the Dirac delta function  on the real line. Since measures (including probability measures) on the real line are special cases of distributions, we can also speak of the support of a measure in the same way.

For example, the support of the Dirac delta is

Singular support

This has the intuitive interpretation as the set of points at which a distribution .

For example, the Fourier transform of the Heaviside step function can, up to constant factors, be considered to be  (a function)  at  While  is clearly a special point, it is more precise to say that the transform of the distribution has singular support : it cannot accurately be expressed as a function in relation to test functions with support including  It  be expressed as an application of a Cauchy principal value  integral.

For distributions in several variables, singular supports allow one to define  and understand Huygens' principle in terms of mathematical analysis. Singular supports may also be used to understand phenomena special to distribution theory, such as attempts to 'multiply' distributions (squaring the Dirac delta function fails – essentially because the singular supports of the distributions to be multiplied should be disjoint).

Family of supports

In extending Poincaré duality to manifolds that are not compact, the 'compact support' idea enters naturally on one side of the duality; see for example Alexander–Spanier cohomology.

Bredon, Sheaf Theory (2nd edition, 1997) gives these definitions. If  is a locally compact space, assumed Hausdorff the family of all compact subsets satisfies the further conditions, making it paracompactifying.

See also

Citations

References 

  
  

Set theory
Real analysis
Topology
Topology of function spaces
Schwartz distributions